Juran may refer to:

 Juran (painter) (巨然), 10th-century Chinese landscape painter
 Juran (surname)
 Juran kingdom, former name of the Kingdom of Burgundy in western Europe (part of modern-day France and Italy)
 Juran Institute, international consulting company founded by Joseph M. Juran

See also